Elena Dementieva was the defending champion, but didn't participate in this competition.

Serena Williams won in the final  4–6, 7–5, 6–4, against Svetlana Kuznetsova.

Seeds
The top four seeds received a bye into the second round. 

  Serena Williams (champion)
  Svetlana Kuznetsova (final)
  Maria Sharapova (semifinals)
  Vera Zvonareva (semifinals)
  Nadia Petrova (quarterfinals, retired due to a left ankle sprain)
  Gisela Dulko (quarterfinals)
  Jelena Janković (quarterfinals, retired due to an aggravation of a right ankle sprain)
  Jelena Dokić (first round)

Draw

Finals

Top half

Bottom half

Qualifying

Seeds

Qualifiers

Qualifying draw

First qualifier

Second qualifier

Third qualifier

Fourth qualifier

External links
 Official results archive (ITF)
 Official results archive (WTA)

China Open
2004 China Open (tennis)